Hibiscus martianus, the heartleaf rosemallow or heart-leaf hibiscus, is a species of flowering plant in the family Malvaceae, native to Texas and Mexico. In the wild it is found growing in a variety of harsh habitats, including in canyons, on scree and gravel, and in the chaparral.

It is highly heat and drought tolerant and is recommended for xeriscaping.

References

martianus
Flora of Texas
Flora of Northeastern Mexico
Flora of Central Mexico
Flora of Veracruz
Plants described in 1851